Pink Lady is an American variety show that aired for five weeks on NBC in 1980, starring the Japanese musical duo of the same name. The show also is referred to by the title Pink Lady and Jeff, referring to co-star Jeff Altman. The show was riddled with complications, including the dispute over the name: agents for the starring parties were never able to settle on one, and the show was advertised both ways during its run. Other difficulties included scriptwriting disagreements, guest star booking mishaps, taping and touring conflicts, and the fact that Mie and Kei, the members of Pink Lady, did not understand or speak English.

Pink Lady was massively popular in Japan and even enjoyed a hit in the U.S. with the English-language song "Kiss in the Dark". A television show for the duo was proposed and swiftly approved. The show's developers, Sid and Marty Krofft, pursued the project under the erroneous assumption that the stars spoke both English and Japanese. When the reality of the situation became apparent, network executives insisted that Mie and Kei not only perform their English dialog by phonetic rote, but also sing that way as well. The resulting clumsy diction compounded the show's other problems, and despite the infusion of very expensive co-stars, the series did poorly and was cancelled after five episodes. The series ranked #35 on TV Guides "The 50 Worst TV Shows of All Time" list.

In Poland, it was broadcast on TVP2 during the 1980's.

Synopsis
The series starred Japanese female singing duo Pink Lady, composed of "Mie" (Mitsuyo Nemoto) and "Kei" (Keiko Masuda), and American comedian Jeff Altman. The format of the show consisted of musical numbers alternating with sketch comedy. A running gag of the series was the girls' lack of understanding of American culture and of English; in reality, Pink Lady spoke no English at all. On the show, Jeff attempted to translate and explain, leading to more confusion.

The series featured Pink Lady performing songs, usually English-language disco and pop songs such as "Boogie Wonderland" or "Yesterday", and interaction with celebrity and musical guests. The group would end the show by jumping into a hot tub together. After the poorly rated series premiere, NBC moved Pink Lady to Friday nights and added Jim Varney as a character actor. The move and retooling failed to help ratings and the series was canceled after five episodes.

Production
The show was the brainchild of Fred Silverman, then president and CEO of NBC, who wanted to replicate the success he had had at ABC and CBS. After seeing a Walter Cronkite story about Pink Lady on the CBS Evening News, Silverman thought their Japanese success could be translated to the American market, so he brought in Sid and Marty Krofft to produce a variety show for them. At the time, Pink Lady had recently achieved their first and only top-40 hit on the U.S. Billboard Hot 100, when their song "Kiss in the Dark" peaked at no. 37 in August 1979. The Krofft brothers were told that the ladies were fluent in English, which they were not. Unsure of how to stage the show, Sid Krofft developed the concept of making "the strangest thing that's ever been on television...The whole show was gonna come out of a little Japanese box." Silverman's response was, "No, that's just too different. Let's just do Donny & Marie."

Comedian Jeff Altman had a contract with NBC, and on that basis, was offered work hosting the show to compensate for the fact that the leads were un-versed in English. Writer Mark Evanier previously worked with the Kroffts on The Krofft Superstar Hour and the pilot Bobby Vinton's Rock 'n' Rollers and was brought on board as head writer, and seasoned variety show director Art Fisher (The Sonny & Cher Comedy Hour) was brought in to direct. According to Evanier, Fisher disliked the show and only participated because he was contractually obligated.

The language barrier proved to be the biggest obstacle. Mie and Kei had to hold English conversations through an on-set translator. The writers struggled because once dialogue had been written for and learned by the ladies, it could not be changed. This was particularly problematic when a guest star would be booked at the last minute, such as Lorne Greene, who agreed to appear on the show only four hours before the episode was taped. Mie and Kei wanted to sing the songs that had made them famous in their native country, but NBC insisted they perform in English. This resulted in recording English songs phonetically and lip-syncing for the show's tapings. Lip-syncing was already a common practice on American variety shows, but it was especially noticeable since the ladies were performing in a language that was foreign to them. Additional problems were caused when the network insisted the writers develop separate identities for Mie and Kei. The established Pink Lady act was that they were so much in unison that they performed as one entity, so the two were not comfortable having separate stage personalities.

Because Mie and Kei commuted between the U.S. and Japan to appear in sold-out concerts, their time on the set was spent memorizing lines and routines, forcing the brunt of the comedy skits on Altman and ensemble players Jim Varney, Cheri Steinkellner and Anna Mathias. On rare occasions when Mie and Kei appeared in sketches, their time was minimal.

Booking guests for the show was also a problem. Variety shows were fading by 1980, which was exacerbated by the fact the series' headliners were not a household name in the U.S. Larry Hagman and other A-list stars were coerced into appearing after receiving sizable monetary incentives. Other stars who had previously worked with the Kroffts were also brought in, including Florence Henderson (The Brady Bunch Hour), Donny Osmond (Donny & Marie), Red Buttons (Side Show) and Bobby Vinton (Bobby Vinton's Rock 'n' Rollers). To ease the need for live, in-person performances, Pink Lady incorporated pre-recorded music videos in lieu of musical acts. Alice Cooper was friends with the Kroffts and submitted an original performance from his upcoming album as a favor to them. Cheap Trick's music video for "Dream Police" was shown as were Blondie's videos for "Shayla" and "Eat to the Beat," both shot for a then-newly released home video.

Each show ended with a tuxedo-clad Jeff getting lured, pushed or pulled into the on-set hot tub by Mie and Kei. This gag originated with Sid Krofft, who had used a similar device on The Brady Bunch Hour; in each episode, Greg would push Peter into the swimming pool. Altman felt it would have been an amusing one-time gag, but by employing it each week, it became contrived. Altman tried to convince the writing staff to do away with this segment, but he was vetoed, most probably because this segment afforded everyone the opportunity to see Mie and Kei in bikinis.

The show's title has often been the source of confusion. The show onscreen was titled Pink Lady, but the series is most commonly referred to as Pink Lady and Jeff. Altman felt that since he carried the show, his name should appear in the title, and the network agreed, but Pink Lady's manager strongly protested and threatened a lawsuit if "and Jeff" appeared on the show's title. NBC's promos occasionally referred to as Pink Lady, whereas at other times the voice-over announcer referred to it as Pink Lady and Jeff. In print advertisements for TV Guide however, the show always was titled Pink Lady and Jeff, though it was cited as Pink Lady in the text TV listings.

Episodes

Syndication
Pink Lady and Jeff reruns were seen on Trio for a brief period.

Home video
On June 26, 2001, Rhino Entertainment released the complete series on Region 1 DVD in the United States.

In popular culture
Harry Shearer appeared as Carl Sagan on Saturday Night Live's spoof "Pink Lady and Carl" with Gilda Radner and Laraine Newman playing the singing duo and Paul Shaffer as special guest star Marvin Hamlisch.

References

External links
 
 Writer Mark Evanier's notes
 producer Marty Krofft on Pink Lady and Jeff

1980 American television series debuts
1980 American television series endings
1980s American sketch comedy television series
1980s American variety television series
English-language television shows
NBC original programming
Television series by Sid and Marty Krofft Television Productions